Tanner Marsh (born May 29, 1990) is a professional American football quarterback who is currently a free agent.

College career
He played college football for the Arkansas Tech Wonder Boys for one season after transferring from West Texas A&M, and he was named honorable mention All-Great American Conference.

Professional career

Montreal Alouettes
He was signed by the Montreal Alouettes on June 1, 2013 and made the team's active roster as the third-string quarterback. He recorded his first professional touchdown pass on August 22, 2013 against the BC Lions with a 3-yard toss to S. J. Green. He scored his first touchdown in that same game with a 6-yard rushing touchdown, and helped lead Montreal to a thrilling 39-38 comeback win for his first career CFL win. He won his first game as a starter September 3, 2013 against the Toronto Argonauts 20-9.
Marsh was released by the Alouettes on April 14, 2016.

Cleveland Gladiators
On March 9, 2017, Marsh was assigned to the Cleveland Gladiators. Marsh made his first career AFL start on April 16, 2017. After throwing for 228 yards and 4 touchdowns, Marsh was removed from the game. On April 19, 2017, Marsh was placed on injured reserve.  On June 21, 2017, Marsh was placed on reassignment. On June 22, 2017, Marsh was assigned to the Gladiators once again.

Texas Revolution
On March 22, 2018, Marsh signed with the Texas Revolution. He was released on April 12, 2018.

Frisco Fighters 
In March 2020, Marsh signed a contract with the Frisco Fighters, an Indoor Football League team.

References

External links
West Texas A&M Buffaloes bio
Montreal Alouettes bio 

1990 births
Living people
People from Carrollton, Texas
Players of American football from Texas
Sportspeople from the Dallas–Fort Worth metroplex
American football quarterbacks
Canadian football quarterbacks
Arkansas Tech Wonder Boys football players
Montreal Alouettes players
West Texas A&M Buffaloes football players
Cleveland Gladiators players
American players of Canadian football
Texas Revolution players